Neutrogena Corporation, trading as Neutrogena, is an American company that markets skin care, hair care and cosmetics owned by parent company Johnson & Johnson and is headquartered in Los Angeles, California. According to product advertising  at their website, Neutrogena products are distributed in more than 70 countries.
 
Neutrogena was founded in 1930 by Emanuel Stolaroff, and was originally a cosmetics company named Natone. Johnson & Johnson acquired the independent company in 1994.
 
The company originally supplied to department stores and salons that catered for the Hollywood film industry.

History 
In 1930, Emanuel Stolaroff started a small company called Natone. Soon, it grew into a larger business, and he started expanding it into retail markets. Stolaroff met Belgian chemist Edmond Fromont in 1954, and acquired the rights to distribute his patented formula of a mild clear soap that cleared the skin, without drying it, in the US. By then, Lloyd Cotsen had entered the Stolaroff family by marrying his daughter Joanne Stolaroff. 
In 1962, the company name was officially changed to Neutrogena Corporation; Cotsen became president in 1967.

The company listed publicly on the NASDAQ in 1973,  with a market value of $1.2 million. Cotsen started marketing soap through two major channels: dermatologists and luxury hotels. Neutrogena managed to stay clear of any major pricing wars, like those of other big corporations of that generation. It launched product lines in acne and anti-aging areas. In 1982, profits reached US$3 million, and Cotsen was named the CEO.

In 1994, Johnson & Johnson acquired Neutrogena for $924 million, at a price of $35.25 per share. Johnson & Johnson's international network helped Neutrogena boost its sales and enter newer markets including India, South Africa, and China. Priced at a premium, Neutrogena products are distributed in over 70 countries. The company has major subsidiaries in Canada, United Kingdom, South Korea and India.

Sunscreen recall
In July 2021, parent company Johnson & Johnson recalled four Neutrogena aerosol sunscreen products and one Aveeno branded spray from stores in the United States after detecting the carcinogen benzene in some samples. The company went on to state that benzene is not used in the manufacturing process of the sprays and said it began an investigation into the source of the contamination.

References

External links 

 

Johnson & Johnson brands
Skin care brands
Shampoo brands
Companies based in Los Angeles
Chemical companies established in 1930
Cosmetics brands
Swiss companies established in 1930
1994 mergers and acquisitions